Petar Borovićanin (born 6 September 1985 in Belgrade) is a Serbian footballer who currently plays for Bocheński KS in the Polish Fourth League.

Notes
 

Serbian footballers
FK Čukarički players
FK BASK players
Sandecja Nowy Sącz players
Kolejarz Stróże players
Górnik Łęczna players
KS Kastrioti players
1985 births
Living people
Serbian expatriate footballers
Expatriate footballers in Poland
Serbian expatriate sportspeople in Poland
Expatriate footballers in Albania
Serbian expatriate sportspeople in Albania
Association football defenders